In software engineering, cycle time is a software metric which estimates development speed in agile software projects. The cycle time measures how long it takes to process a given job - whether it's a client request, an order,  or a defined production process stage. The crucial aspect of measuring the cycle time is considering only the active, operating processing time and discarding any idle, waiting, or service times occurring mid-process. 

The cycle time is a useful metric. In contrast to lead time, which measures the time that the customer waits for their request to be realized, cycle time only counts the time the team spends actively working on the request. The core use of cycle times is to identify the average development times for specific teams or given request types. This lets the software engineering manager predict team engagements and better schedule work.

See also 
 Software quality
 Statistical quality control

Further reading 
 What is waste? (Agile Alliance)
 Takt time - Cycle time (The Lean Thinker)
 Lead time versus Cycle Time – Untangling the confusion

References 

Rates
Clock signal
Instruction processing